Brownlowioideae is a subfamily of the botanical family Malvaceae. The genera in this subfamily used to be a part of the paraphyletic Tiliaceae until taxonomic revisions in part by the APG II system.

References

 
Rosid subfamilies